Sceloporus horridus, the horrible spiny lizard, rough lizard, or southern rough lizard, is a species of lizard in the family Phrynosomatidae. It is endemic to Mexico.

Gallery

References

Sceloporus
Endemic reptiles of Mexico
Reptiles described in 1834
Taxa named by Arend Friedrich August Wiegmann